This list of waterfalls by flow rate includes all waterfalls which are known to have an average flow rate or discharge of at least . The waterfalls in this list are those for which there is verifiable information for, and should not be assumed to be a complete list of waterfalls which would otherwise qualify as globally significant based on this metric.

Largest extant waterfalls

Largest historic waterfalls
This list comprises the waterfalls which have ceased to exist due to the impoundment of their river(s) by a dam, or due to the diversion of the watercourse.

Prehistoric waterfalls

See also
Waterfall
List of rivers by discharge
List of waterfalls
List of waterfalls by height
List of waterfalls by type
Orders of magnitude (power)

References

External links

World Waterfall Database

Flow rate